7,8-Dihydroneopterin triphosphate (DHNTP) is an intermediate in tetrahydrobiopterin biosynthesis.  It is transformed by 6-pyruvoyltetrahydropterin synthase into 6-pyruvoyl-tetrahydropterin.  It is also used in the Queuosine/Archeosine Pathway.

Synonyms 
Dihydroneopterin Triphosphate
7,8-dihydroneopterin 3'-triphosphate
6-(L-erythro-1,2-Dihydroxypropyl 3-triphosphate)-7,8-dihydropterin
6-[(1S,2R)-1,2-dihydroxy-3-triphosphooxypropyl]-7,8-dihydropterin
6-(L-erythro-1,2-dihydroxy-3-triphosphooxypropyl)-7,8-dihydropterin
2-amino-4-hydroxy-6-(erythro-1,2,3-trihydroxypropyl)dihydropteridine triphosphate
2-Amino-4-hydroxy-6-(erythro-1,2,3-trihydroxypropyl)dihydropteridinetriphosphate
(2R,3S)-3-(2-amino-4-oxo-3,4,7,8-tetrahydropteridin-6-yl)-2,3-dihydroxypropyl tetrahydrogen triphosphate

References 

Organophosphates
Pteridines
Phosphate esters